BCIA may refer to:

 BCIA Inc., a Canadian security firm
 Beijing Capital International Airport
 Beijing Capital International Airport Company Limited, the operator of Beijing Capital International Airport
 Berne Convention Implementation Act of 1988, a U.S. copyright act
 Biofeedback Certification International Alliance
 British Construction Industry Awards